Pinkafeld (Romani: Pinkafa) is a city in Burgenland in Austria and the second largest settlement (after Oberwart) in the district Oberwart.

Geography 
Parts of the commune are Hochart, Gfangen, Alt-Pinkafeld, Nord-Pinkafeld and Pinkafeld Stadt.

History 
 860 - The first mention of Pinkafeld ("Peincahu")
 1289 - The destruction of Pinkafeld ("Pinkafelde")
 1397 - Pinkafeld is no longer part of Bernstein
 1532 - The Ottomans destroy Pinkafeld
 1658 - Ádám Batthyány constructs a castle in Pinkafeld
 1921 - Pinkafeld becomes part of Austria, no longer under control by Hungary

Population

Politics 
The mayor is Kurt Maczek of the SPÖ (Social Democratic Party of Austria). The vice-Mayor is Thomas Pickl of the ÖVP (Austrian People's Party). In the representation, which has 25 mandates, the SPÖ has 16 mandates and the ÖVP has 9.

Events 

In 2012, the FCI European Open Junior Agility competition was hosted in Pinkafeld.

Notable people from Pinkafeld 
 Norbert Hofer, an Austrian politician

See also 
 Pinka

References

 
Cities and towns in Oberwart District